Grand Production (/Grand produkcija) is a Serbian record label and production company predominantly focused on folk performers. The label produces the weekly television show Grand Parada, launched their own cable television channel, and organize a competitive festival of pop-folk and turbo-folk music, Grand Festival.

TV shows
Since its founding in 1998, the label has produced the weekly television variety show Grand Parada (or Zvezda Granda), to serve as a showcase for Grand Production's artists. It aired on the Serbian network Pink TV until 2014, when Grand launched their own cable channel, Grand TV, through a contract with United Group. They have a full programming schedule, and also air shows on Prva Srpska Televizija in Serbia and Montenegro, Nova BH in Bosnia and Herzegovina, and on Kanal 5 in North Macedonia.  Grand TV is also available in Europe, Canada, United States and Australia.

The list of Grand Production programs:
 Grand Show
 Grand Parada
 Grand Stars
 Grand Stars Special, formerly Grand Stars – people ask
 Fantastic Show
 Grand Magazine

Grand Festival
The label organizes this competitive festival of pop-folk and turbo-folk music.  Grand Festival runs over multiple evenings, and in 2008 had two semi-finals with the top 12 acts from each advancing to a final show.  The audience and a jury vote for the winners, who receive cash prizes.

Artists
Artists currently signed to Grand:

Aca Lukas (2000, 2006–2010, 2013–present)
Aco Pejović (2006–present)
Aleksa Perović (2017–present)
Aleksandar Aca Ilić (1998–2005, 2007–present)
Aleksandar Sofronijević (2010–present)
Aleksandra Bursać (2009–present)
Aleksandra Mladenović (2016–present)
Aleksandra Prijović (2013–present)
Ana Bekuta (1999–present)
Ana Kokić (2006–present)
Ana Sević (2012–present)
Anabela Atijas (2016–present)
Andreana Čekić (2012–present)
Armin Dedić (2017–present)
Bane Mojićević (2004–present)
Beki Bekić (2004–present)
Biljana Jevtić ( 2004–present)
Biljana Sečivanović (2009–present)
Bora Drljača (1999–2020)
Branka Sovrlić (2002, 2016–present)
Cakana (2010–present)
Čeda Marković (2010–present)
Dado Polumenta (2005, 2010–2013, 2017–present)
Ćira (2001–present)
Darko Filipović (2004–present)
Darko Lazić (2009–present)
Dejan Matić (2002–present)
Dušan Svilar (2007–present)
Dragan Kojić Keba (2004–2011, 2013–present)
Dragi Domić (2011–present)
Džej (2005–2020)
Đani (2000–2008, 2012–present)
Đogani (2016–present)
Elma Sinanović (2000–2004)
Enes Begović (2002–present)
Era Ojdanić (2000–present)
Gile (2013–present)
Goca Božinovska (1998–present)
Goca Lazarević (1999–2006, 2008–present)
Grupa Luna (2014–present)
Halid Muslimović (2001–present)
Haris Berković (2015–present)
Ilda Šaulić (2007–2012, 2014–present)
Indira Radić (2000–2015, 2017–present)
Indy (2006–present)
Ivana Pavković (2011–present)
Ivana Selakov (2010–present)
Jana (1999–2003, 2011–present)
Jašar Ahmedovski (2000–2005, 2014–present)
Jelena Broćić (1999–2003, 2013–present)
Jelena Gerbec (2011–present)
Jelena Karleuša (1999, 2015–present)
Jelena Kostov (2009–present)
Jovan Perišić (2011–present)
Jovan Stefanović (2009–present)
Katarina Grujić (2013–present)
Katarina Živković (2007–present)
Lepa Brena (1998–present)
Lepa Lukić (2006–present) 
Ljuba Aličić (2013–present)
Ljubomir Perućica (2014–present)
Maja Marijana (1999, 2003–2009, 2015–present)
Marija Šerifović (2015–present)
Marina Tadić (2015–present)
Marinko Rokvić (2000–present)
Marko Gačić (2014–present)
Marko Rokvić (2010–present)
Milan Dinčić Dinča (2007–present)
Milan Mitrović (2011–present)
Mia Borisavljević (2008–2010, 2014–present)
Mile Kitić (1998–present)
Milica Pavlović (2012–present)
Milica Todorović (2005–present)
Miloš Bojanić (2000–2006, 2012–present)
Miloš Brkić (2012–present)
Miloš Vujanović (2014–present)
Mina Kostić (2005–present)
Mira Škorić (2001–present)
Mirjana Mirković (2011–present)
Mirza Selimović (2014–present)
Mitar Mirić (2000–2009, 2013–present)
Merima Njegomir (2001–2002, 2015–present)
Nada Topčagić (2004–present)
Nadica Ademov (2012–present)
Nataša Đorđević (1998–2005, 2008–present)
Neda Ukraden (2001–2008, 2013–present)
Nena Đurović (2004, 2013–present)
Nemanja Nikolić (2004–present)
Nemanja Stevanović (2007–2010, 2013–present)
Nikolina Kovač (2012–present)
Novica Zdravković  (2000–present)
Olja Karleuša (2003–2015, 2016–present)
Osman Hadžić (2014–present)
Osvajači (1999–2001, 2015–present)
Peđa Medenica (2012–present)
Petar Mitić (2011–present)
Predrag Živković Tozovac (2002–present)
Rada Manojlović (2007–present)
Rade Lacković (2001–2006, 2015–present)
Radiša Urošević (2006–present)
Reni (2000–2004, 2015–present)
Romana Panić (2015–present)
Snežana Đurišić (2003–present)
Snežana Savić (2000–present)
Sanja Đorđević (1999–present)
Saša Matić (2001–2003, 2005–present)
Saša Kapor (2012–present)
Selma Bajrami (2001, 2007–2013, 2015–present)
Sejo Kalač (2003–2007, 2015–present)
Slobodan Vasić (2009–present)
Snežana Babić Sneki (2004–present)
Stefan Petrušić (2011–present)
Stoja (1999–2010, 2017–present)
Suzana Jovanović (1999–present)
Svetlana Tanasić (2009–present)
Šako Polumenta (1999, 2015–present)
Šeki Turković (1999–2004, 2013–present)
Tina Ivanović (2004–present)
Trik FX (2015–present)
Topalko (2009–present)
Verica Šerifović (1998–2005, 2008–present)
Vesna Zmijanac (2003–2011, 2013–present)
Viki Miljković (2001–2011, 2016–present)
Zlata Petrović (2001–2007, 2010–present)
Zorica Marković (2000–present)

Artists previously signed to Grand:
Al Dino (2007–2009)
Anica Milenković (1998–2006)
Bane Bojanić (1999–2001)
Blizanci (2005–2009)
Bojan Bjelić (2006–2009)
Bojan Tomović (2005–2007)
Boki Milošević (1999–2010)
Boža Nikolić (1998–2004)
Ćana (2000–2006)
Ceca (2001)
Cvijetin Nikić (2000–2004)
Dara Bubamara (2003–2009, 2014–2016)
Danijela Vranić (2006–2010)
Dragana Mirković (1992-1993, 1999)
Donna Ares (2006–2009)
Goga Sekulić (2006–2010)
Goran Vukošić (1999)
Haris Džinović (2000)
Ivana Šašić  (2005–2008)
Jadranka Barjaktarović  (2005–2016)
Jelena Jeca Krsmanović (2002, 2013–2016)
Jovana Tipšin (2003–2008)
Kemal Monteno (2007–2014)
Lepa Đorđević (2006)
Marina Živković (2002)
Marta Savić (1999–2007)
Maya Berović (2007)
Mikica Bojanić  (2001–2002)
Milan Stanković (2007–2010)
Milena Plavšić (2000–2005)
Medo Sakić (2000)
Nataša Kojić (2004–2009)
Nikola Rokvić (2006–2013)
Nela Bijanić (1999–2003)
Predrag Gojković Cune (2000–2002)
Sanja Maletić (2001)
Saška Karan (2001)
Seka Aleksić (2002–2015)
Slavica Ćukteraš (2003–2013)
Suzana Mančić (2004)
Šaban Šaulić (1999–2016)
Šemsa Suljaković (2000)
Tanja Savić (2004–2016)
Vesna Rivas (1999–2000)
Zoran Vanev (2003–2005)
Zorica Brunclik (2010–2015)
Žaklina Ilić (2000)
Željko Samardžić (1999)
Željko Šašić (1999, 2003–2013)

References

External links

 
D.o.o. companies in Serbia
List of Grand Production artists
List of Grand Production albums
Pop record labels
Record labels established in 1998
1998 establishments in Serbia
Companies based in Belgrade
Serbian record labels